James FitzGerald or James Fitzgerald may refer to:

Irish nobility and politicians 

James Fitzedmund Fitzgerald (died 1589), hereditary Seneschal of Imokilly
James FitzMaurice FitzGerald (died 1579), member of the 16th century ruling Geraldine dynasty
James FitzGerald (Ratoath MP) (1689), Irish politician, MP for Ratoath 1689
James FitzGerald (Inistioge MP) (1689), Irish politician, MP for Inistioge 1689
James Fitzgerald (1742–1835), Irish politician
James FitzGerald, 1st Duke of Leinster (1722–1773), Irish nobleman and politician

James FitzGerald-Kenney (1878–1956), Irish politician
James Gubbins Fitzgerald (1852–1926), medical practitioner and an Irish nationalist politician

Earls
James FitzGerald, 1st Earl of Desmond (1570–1601), Irish nobleman
James FitzGerald, 6th Earl of Desmond (died 1463)
James FitzGerald, 8th Earl of Desmond (1459–1487)
James FitzGerald, 10th Earl of Desmond (died 1529), Earl of Desmond
James FitzGerald, de jure 12th Earl of Desmond (died 1540)
James FitzGerald, 13th Earl of Desmond (died 1558), Irish nobleman
James FitzThomas FitzGerald (died 1608), the Sugán Earl, Earl of Desmond

Other politicians
James FitzGerald (New Zealand politician) (1818–1896), New Zealand politician
James Fitzgerald (American jurist, born 1851) (1851–1922), New York lawyer, politician, and judge
James F. Fitzgerald (1895–1975), New York state senator (1949–1952)

Sportspeople 
James Fitzgerald (athlete), born 1883, Canadian Olympic athlete
James Fitzgerald (Australian cricketer) (1874–1950), Australian cricketer
James Fitzgerald (English cricketer) (1945–2013), English cricketer
James Fitzgerald (New Zealand cricketer) (1862–1943), New Zealand cricketer
Jamie Fitzgerald (American football), born 1965, American football defensive back
Jamie Fitzgerald (rugby league), born 1979, rugby league player
Jim Fitzgerald (footballer) (1924–2003), Australian footballer
Jim Fitzgerald (racing driver) (1921–1987), American racing driver

Others 
James Newbury FitzGerald (1837–1907), American bishop
James FitzGerald (artist) (1910–1973), American artist
James E. FitzGerald, 4th President of Fairfield University from 1958 to 1964
James Martin Fitzgerald (1920–2011), American judge
Jim Fitzgerald (James Francis Fitzgerald, 1926–2012), American businessman and philanthropist
James Edward Fitzgerald (bishop) (1938–2003), American Roman Catholic bishop
James R. Fitzgerald (born 1953), American criminal profiler and forensic linguist
James L. Fitzgerald, Indologist at Brown University
James FitzGerald (writer), Canadian writer

Fictional characters
James "Jim" Fitzgerald, a character from Grand Theft Auto: The Lost and Damned